"Ur So Gay" is a song released by American singer Katy Perry from her EP of the same name. She co-wrote the song with its producer Greg Wells while Drew Pearson served as the track's engineer. It was later included on her second studio album One of the Boys.

Background and composition
When asked about the song, Perry said it was about a metrosexual boy. The song "wasn't meant to be a big single or show what the album is going to be all about. That was for my Internet bloggers, so I'm not coming out of nowhere." Perry's A&R representative Chris Anokute confirmed this by saying that they had no plans for radio coverage but just wanted to put this "novelty" song out online as an introduction to see "what the attraction was". As expected, sales were low, but Anokute said the track did well in terms of building a press story. Due to the song's content, there was concern from the label over commercially releasing "Ur So Gay".

"Ur So Gay" moves at a moderate pace. According to digital sheet music published at Musicnotes.com by Sony-ATV Music Publishing, the song is written in the key of E minor and the tempo is at 80 beats per minute. Perry's vocal's in "Ur So Gay" span from the lower note of E3 to the higher note of D#5.

Promotion and reception

The song's lyrics have been described in a positive review as "eighteen different kinds of wrong". The song itself has been described as an "emo-bashing anthem that's either horribly homophobic, a sly piece of social commentary or, possibly, both". The Tampa Bay Times wrote that the "boyfriend-skewering..... isn't homophobic, but it does pummel straight guys who can't handle her edge". Billboard senior editor Chuck Taylor believed the song "has all the potential to amuse the masses," further commenting that the song is "just too good" for top 40 programmers to not play.

Some critics, however, conclude the song is homophobic. Ugo.com says the song settles for "catchphrase-homophobia" while AllMusic describes the lyrics as "gay-baiting". Writing for Glamour, Christopher Rosa called the track Perry's worst song. He criticized its "offensive queer tropes" and found its lyrics problematic.

Music video

Background
The video was directed by Walter May and released in November 2007. According to senior vice president of A&R at Capitol Records Bob Semanovich, the purpose of the video was to introduce Perry to audiences in a way that was "fun and playful". Perry conceived the idea to center the video around dolls, as she wanted audiences to know that the song was meant as a "tongue-in-cheek dis[s] track".

Synopsis
In the video, Perry plays the song in front of a bright cartoon-like background with clouds that have smiley faces on them. The characters in the video are played by Fashion Royalty dolls.

Live performances
Perry performed the song as part of her MTV Unplugged  set. Also on Hello Katy Tour and California Dreams Tour.

Credits and personnel
Credits and personnel adapted from the One of the Boys album liner notes.
Katy Perry – writer, vocals, whistles
Greg Wells – writer, producer, piano, guitar, bass, beats
Drew Pearson – recording at Rocket Carousel Studio (Los Angeles)
Joe Zook – mixing at Aus Studios (Studio City)
Jerry Hey – horn section, horn arrangement
Gary Grant – horn section
Bill Reichenbach – horn section
Dan Higgins – horn section

Charts

Certifications and sales

References

2007 songs
Katy Perry songs
LGBT-related songs
Songs written by Katy Perry
Songs written by Greg Wells
Song recordings produced by Greg Wells
LGBT-related controversies in music
Trip hop songs